In social choice theory, Neutrality is a basic requirement of a social choice rule. It says that the rule does not discriminate apriori between different candidates. In other words, if the vector of candidates is permuted arbitrarily, then the returned result is permuted in the same way.

Neutral rules 
Most voting rules are neutral. For example, plurality voting is neutral, since only counts the number of votes received by each candidate, without giving an a-priori preference to any candidate. Similarly, the utilitarian rule and egalitarian rule are both neutral, since the only consider the utility given to each candidate, regardless of the candidate's name or index.

Non-neutral rules 
An example of a non-neutral rule is a rule which says that, in case of a tie, the alternative X is selected. This is particularly prominent in cases in which X is the status quo option; it is often preferred to keep the status quo unless there is a strict majority against it.

See also 

 Anonymity (social choice) - a related requirement, saying that the rule does not discriminate apriori between different voters.

References 

Social choice theory